HMS Regulus (N88) was a  built for the Royal Navy during the 1930s.

Design and description
They displaced  on the surface and  submerged. The Rainbow-class submarines had a crew of 56 officers and ratings.

For surface running, the boats were powered by two  diesel engines, each driving one propeller shaft. When submerged each propeller was driven by a  electric motor. They could reach  on the surface and  underwater.

The boats were armed with six  torpedo tubes in the bow and two more in the stern. They carried six reload torpedoes for a grand total of fourteen torpedoes. They were also armed with a QF 4.7-inch (120 mm) Mark IX deck gun.

Construction and career
Regulus was laid down by Vickers-Armstrong at Barrow-in-Furness and launched in 1930. Before Second World War she was stationed with Submarine Flotilla #4 on the China station, based out of Hong Kong.

In October 1939 Regulus conducted intelligence-gathering operations in the mouth of the Bungo Strait, off the coast of Japan. It covertly observed Imperial Japanese Navy fleet exercises, including  and a brand new Japanese aircraft carrier, likely . It had also entered Shibushi Bay and Osaka Bay via the Kitan Strait, producing photographic intelligence.

Regulus (Lt.Cdr. Frederick Basil Currie, RN) left Alexandria to patrol in the southern Adriatic on 23 November 1940. She was lost with her entire crew on 6 December 1940 whilst on patrol off Taranto, Italy. In all probability she hit a mine.

Notes

References
 
  
 
 
 

 

Rainbow-class submarines
Ships built in Barrow-in-Furness
1930 ships
World War II submarines of the United Kingdom
Maritime incidents in December 1940
World War II shipwrecks in the Mediterranean Sea
Ships lost with all hands